Greater Brandvlei Dam is an earth-fill type dam located on a tributary of the Breede River, near Worcester, Western Cape, South Africa.  It was formed by joining the original Brandvlei Dam (Lake Marais) and the Kwaggaskloof Dam after reconstruction in 1989. Its main purpose is for irrigation use and the hazard potential of the dam has been ranked high (3).

See also
List of reservoirs and dams in South Africa
List of rivers of South Africa

References 

 List of South African Dams from the Department of Water Affairs and Forestry (South Africa)

Dams in South Africa
Dams completed in 1989